The Dibo are an ethnic group located in central Nigeria. They are located near the city of Bida and they are largely Muslim.
Their language is closely related to Nupe, of Nupoid, branch. And are family language with Nupe.
They are found mostly in Lapai, Niger state, and FCT Abuja, and Kwara with similarities to;

Gupa
Abawa

They live in 60 percent of Lapai land as the area of their primary settlement.

External links
The Joshua Project, on the Dibo.

Ethnic groups in Nigeria